Béatrice Descamps (born 22 June 1951 in Valenciennes) is a French politician in the National Assembly and a former member of the Senate of France. She represented the Nord department and is a member of the Union of Democrats and Independents. She has been Member of Parliament for Nord's 21st constituency since 2017.

References
Page on the Senate website
Page on the Assembly website

1951 births
Living people
People from Valenciennes
Politicians from Hauts-de-France
Union for a Popular Movement politicians
The Republicans (France) politicians
Union of Democrats and Independents politicians
Radical Movement politicians
French Senators of the Fifth Republic
Senators of Nord (French department)
Deputies of the 15th National Assembly of the French Fifth Republic
Women members of the Senate (France)
21st-century French women politicians
Deputies of the 16th National Assembly of the French Fifth Republic